Bacteroidales is an order of bacteria. Notably it includes the genera Prevotella and Bacteroides , which are commonly found in the human gut microbiota.

Phylogeny
The currently accepted taxonomy is based on the List of Prokaryotic names with Standing in Nomenclature and National Center for Biotechnology Information (NCBI).

Notes

See also
 List of bacterial orders
 List of bacteria genera

References

Bacteroidia